Tuiyo Evei is a Papua New Guinean former professional rugby league footballer who represented Papua New Guinea at the 1995 World Cup.

Playing career
Evei first represented Papua New Guinea in 1988 against Great Britain. He went on to play in eleven test matches for Papua New Guinea.

In 1993 he was part of the Goroka Lahanis side that defeated the Port Moresby Vipers to win the SP Cup grand final for the first time.

In 1995 he was part of Papua New Guinea's World Cup campaign, playing in one match at the tournament.

He died in 1998 in a car accident.

References

1998 deaths
Goroka Lahanis players
Papua New Guinea national rugby league team players
Papua New Guinean rugby league players
Road incident deaths in Papua New Guinea
Rugby league props
Rugby league second-rows
Year of birth missing